United Nations General Assembly Resolution ES‑11/2 is the second resolution of the eleventh emergency special session of the United Nations General Assembly, adopted on 24 March 2022, following Resolution ES-11/1 which was adopted on 2 March 2022. Resolution ES‑11/2 reaffirmed the UN's former commitments and obligations under its Charter, and reiterated its demand that Russia withdraw from Ukraine's recognized sovereign territory; it also deplored, expressed grave concern over and condemned attacks on civilian populations and infrastructure. Fourteen principles were agreed.

Background 

An emergency special session is an unscheduled meeting of the United Nations General Assembly to make urgent recommendations on a particular situation relevant for the maintenance of international peace and security in any instance where the Security Council fails to act owing to the veto of a permanent member.

The mechanism was introduced in 1950 with the Uniting for Peace resolution, which declared that:

...if the Security Council, because of lack of unanimity of the permanent members, fails to exercise its primary responsibility for the maintenance of international peace and security in any case where there appears to be a threat to the peace, breach of the peace, or act of aggression, the General Assembly shall consider the matter immediately with a view to making appropriate recommendations to Members for collective measures, including in the case of a breach of the peace or act of aggression the use of armed force when necessary, to maintain or restore international peace and security. If not in session at the time, the General Assembly may meet in emergency special session within twenty-four hours of the request therefore. 

The General Assembly's ability to recommend collective measures was the subject of an intense dispute in the 1950s and 1960s. In 1962, an advisory opinion of the International Court of Justice stated that, while "enforcement action" is the exclusive domain of the Security Council, the General Assembly has the authority to take a wide range of decisions, including establishing a peacekeeping force.

11th Emergency Session
On 24 February 2022, Russia launched a large-scale invasion against Ukraine. A draft resolution deploring the invasion and calling for the withdrawal of Russian troops was vetoed in the Security Council the following day, prompting the Security Council to convene an emergency special session on the subject of Ukraine with United Nations Security Council Resolution 2623. An emergency special session on 25 February issued Resolution ES-11/1 of 2 March which deplored Russia's invasion of Ukraine and demanded a full withdrawal of Russian forces and a reversal of its decision to recognise the self-declared People's Republics of Donetsk and Luhansk. The paragraph 10 of the United Nations General Assembly Resolution of 2 March 2022 confirmed the involvement of Belarus in unlawful use of force against Ukraine. The resolution was sponsored by 96 countries, and passed with 141 voting in favour, 5 against, and 35 abstentions. Military action by the Russian Federation continued and the 11th Emergency Session was resumed; on 24 March it issued Resolution ES-11/2, and on 7 April issued Resolution ES-11/3.

Resolution ES-11/2
The resolution reaffirmed its former commitments and obligations under the United Nations Charter. It reiterated its demand that Russia withdraw from Ukraine's recognized sovereign territory; it also deplored, expressed grave concern over and condemned attacks on civilian populations and infrastructure. Fourteen principles were agreed. Briefly, the principles demanded the full implementation of resolution ES-11/1, immediate cessation of the hostilities by the Russian Federation against Ukraine, full protection of civilians, including humanitarian personnel, journalists and persons in vulnerable situations, and encouraged "continued negotiation". The 11th Emergency Session was adjourned.

Voting

See also 
 
 Eleventh emergency special session of the United Nations General Assembly
 Legality of the 2022 Russian invasion of Ukraine
 United Nations General Assembly Resolution 68/262
 United Nations General Assembly Resolution ES-11/1
 United Nations General Assembly Resolution ES-11/3
 United Nations General Assembly Resolution ES-11/4
 United Nations General Assembly Resolution ES-11/5
 United Nations General Assembly resolution
 United Nations Security Council Resolution 2623

References

External links
Text of resolution ES-11/2 at UN Digital Library 

United Nations General Assembly resolutions
Reactions to the 2022 Russian invasion of Ukraine
Russo-Ukrainian War
2022 in Russia
2022 in Ukraine
2022 in the United Nations
Ukraine and the United Nations
Russia and the United Nations
February 2022 events